Dragontown is the fifteenth solo album by American rock musician Alice Cooper. It was released in 2001 on Spitfire Records. Like Brutal Planet, the album displays a heavier metal style than many of his previous releases. It peaked on Billboard's "Top Independent Albums" Chart at #12, and the Billboard 200 at #197, his lowest album chart performance since 1983’s DaDa, which did not chart at all.

This is the first Alice Cooper studio album to contain no singles. Although Cooper toured the album with his Descent into Dragontown tour in 2001 and 2002, only four Dragontown songs – “Sex, Death and Money”, “Fantasy Man”, “Every Woman Has a Name”, and “Triggerman” – were performed at all during this supporting tour, with only “Sex, Death and Money” and “Fantasy Man” remaining in the setlist to the end. With the exception of five performances of “Disgraceland” in July 2003 during the Bare Bones Tour, nothing from Dragontown has ever been performed live subsequent to the end of the album’s supporting tour.

Story and themes
Doug Van Pelt, editor of the Christian music oriented HM Magazine, likened Cooper to C.S. Lewis, stating that he "grabs the devil's microphone and attempts to spill his guts and reveal his wicked schemes." Van Pelt further states that "It's Much Too Late" exposes "unrestrained truth" in stating that "The road to hell is littered with nice guys and good intentions..." and likens "Sex, Death and Money" to Proverbs 5 and isn't really about 'Sex, Death, and Money, but talks against it, as the Bible states.

"Somewhere in the Jungle" addresses the issue of genocide and tribal warfare in Africa.

The track Disgraceland sees Cooper deliver verses while impersonating Elvis Presley. The song relates to Presley's final years and subsequent death and of the track, Cooper has said: "I'm sort of doing a commentary on the absurdity of it, the fact that the greatest rock 'n' roll hero of all time died on a toilet."

Track listing

A special edition was released on September 24, 2002, limited to 7,500 units. It includes the original album and a bonus disc with four additional tracks.

Personnel
Alice Cooper - Vocals
Ryan Roxie - Guitar
Greg Smith - Bass

Session musicians
Tim Pierce - Guitar
Wayne Swinny - Guitar
Bob Marlette - Rhythm Guitar, Bass, Keyboards and programming, String arrangement
Sid Riggs - Keyboards and programming
Teddy Andreadis - Backing vocals
Eric Dover - Backing vocals
Calico Cooper - Backing vocals
Gionvanna Morana - Backing vocals
Kenny Aronoff - Drums

References

External links
 Alice Cooper Dragontown Tour Program

Alice Cooper albums
2001 albums
Concept albums
Albums produced by Bob Marlette
Spitfire Records albums